The 2022 Callao oil spill is a crude oil spill that occurred on 15 January 2022, on the coast of the Ventanilla district in the constitutional province of Callao, Peru, after abnormal waves caused by the volcanic eruption in Tonga and alleged negligence on the side of company Repsol. It has been qualified by the Environmental Assessment and Control Agency as the greatest ecological disaster that has occurred in Peru.

Facts 
The spill began in the early morning of 15 January 2022 during the process of unloading crude oil at the La Pampilla refinery of the Spanish company Repsol in Callao. Initially, Repsol indicated that only 7 gallons of crude oil had been spilled, but in the morning it was found that the magnitude of the disaster was vastly greater, calculating 6,000 barrels dumped into the sea.

Peru's Environment Minister, Rubén Ramírez Mateo, stated that the oil company did not immediately report the accident to the Peruvian government, and that the fine could amount to 138 million soles, about 35 million dollars.

Government response 
On Wednesday, 19 January, the President of the Republic, Pedro Castillo, flew over the areas affected by the oil spill. The following day, he signed a supreme decree declaring the climate emergency of national interest. The Peruvian Prosecutor's Office opened an investigation for environmental contamination against the La Pampilla Refinery. For its part, Repsol defends that neither the Peruvian government nor the Navy issued tsunami alerts on the Peruvian coast, so its operations were not suspended.

References

External links 

Oil spills in South America
Disasters in Peru
2022 in Peru
2022 in the environment
2022 Hunga Tonga eruption and tsunami
2022 disasters in Peru